Silviu Florea (born 19 April 1977, in Bucharest) is a Romanian rugby union player. He plays as a prop.

He played for RC Cannes-Mandelieu before returning to Romania, where he played for Steaua Bucharest, from 2003 to 2006, winning the Divizia Naţională. He then moved back to France, to play for Racing Métro 92, until 2006, when he joined AS Béziers.

He made his debut for Romania on 18 November 2000 against Italy. He went to play at the 2003 Rugby World Cup, the 2007 Rugby World Cup and the 2011 Rugby World Cup.

Notes

1977 births
Living people
Romanian rugby union players
Rugby union props
Romania international rugby union players
Racing 92 players
AS Béziers Hérault players
Union Bordeaux Bègles players
Romanian expatriate rugby union players
Expatriate rugby union players in France
Romanian expatriate sportspeople in France
Rugby union players from Bucharest
US Montauban players